Cracked Actor (Live Los Angeles '74) is a live album by English singer-songwriter David Bowie. It was released posthumously as a Record Store Day release on 22 April 2017 through Parlophone record label. Produced by Bowie and mixed by Tony Visconti, it was recorded on the Diamond Dogs Tour in September 1974, some material from which appeared in the BBC documentary Cracked Actor.

The full show spans across five sides of vinyl, with the sixth featuring an etching of Bowie. The album differs from the first Bowie live album, David Live, recorded on the same tour. It features a different and more R&B-oriented lineup, including long time collaborators Earl Slick and Carlos Alomar, as well as backing singer Luther Vandross. The setlist also includes material recorded for The Gouster, an album which later would turn into Young Americans.

The album received a wider release on CD through the same label on 16 June 2017.

Critical reception

Pitchfork critic Chris Randle wrote: "Hearing drums here distinct from murk, you can tell how complex the rhythm of '1984' was, its groove swerving in circles to welcome every new element. Bowie spent the mid-‘70s obsessed with power, wielding it through deeper and deeper timbre, until his seductions seemed purged of emotion: a ballad sung by a vampire. Cracked Actor shows he was already using his phrasing to command attention."

Track listing
All tracks written by David Bowie, except where noted.

 "Introduction" – 1:47
 "1984" – 2:55
 "Rebel Rebel" – 2:31
 "Moonage Daydream – 5:17
 "Sweet Thing / Candidate / Sweet Thing (Reprise)" – 7:41
 "Changes" – 3:47
 "Suffragette City" – 3:49
 "Aladdin Sane" – 5:01
 "All the Young Dudes" – 4:09
 "Cracked Actor" – 3:20
 "Rock 'n' Roll with Me" (Bowie, Warren Peace) – 4:54
 "Knock On Wood" (Steve Cropper, Eddie Floyd) – 3:16
 "It's Gonna Be Me" – 7:11
 "Space Oddity" – 5:23
 "Future Legend/Diamond Dogs" – 6:58
 "Big Brother/Chant Of The Ever-Circling Skeletal Family" – 4:05
 "Time" – 5:44
 "The Jean Genie" – 5:45
 "Rock 'n' Roll Suicide" – 5:10
 "John, I'm Only Dancing (Again)" – 8:41

Personnel
David Bowie – vocals
Earl Slick – guitar
Carlos Alomar – rhythm guitar
Mike Garson – piano, mellotron
David Sanborn – alto saxophone, flute
Richard Grando – baritone saxophone, flute
Doug Rauch – bass
Greg Errico – drums
Pablo Rosario – percussion
Gui Andrisano – backing vocals
Warren Peace – backing vocals
Ava Cherry – backing vocals
Robin Clark – backing vocals
Anthony Hinton – backing vocals
Diane Sumler – backing vocals
Luther Vandross – backing vocals

Charts

References

External links
 

2017 live albums
David Bowie live albums
Albums produced by David Bowie
Live albums published posthumously
Parlophone live albums